Boana riojana is a species of frog in the family Hylidae. It is found in the Eastern Andes and Andean foothills between La Rioja Province in Argentina and northern Bolivia, and possibly further into adjacent Peru. Common name Carrizo's tree frog has been used when referring to the formerly recognized Boana varelae (Carrizo, 1992).

Ecological requirements of this species are largely unknown.

References

Boana
Amphibians of the Andes
Amphibians of Argentina
Amphibians of Bolivia
Amphibians described in 1895
Taxa named by Julio Germán Koslowsky
Taxonomy articles created by Polbot